Tareh (also Romanized as Ţareh; also known as Turreh) is a village in Barzrud Rural District, in the Central District of Natanz County, Isfahan Province, Iran. At the 2006 census, its population was 244, in 124 families.

References 

Populated places in Natanz County